Kenchū-ji (建中寺) is a Jōdo-shū  Buddhist temple in Tsutsui, Higashi-ku, Nagoya, central Japan. Starting in the Edo period, the mausoleums of the lords of the Owari Domain were located there, making it the Bodaiji of the Owari Tokugawa family. 

The present main hall of the Nagoya Tōshō-gū was a mausoleum for Lord Tokugawa Yoshinao's consort Haruhime (春姫), which used to be located at Kenchū-ji, and was moved to the site in 1953 as a replacement. It is a designated cultural property of Aichi prefecture.

See also 
 Jōkō-ji (Seto)

References

External links 

 http://www.kenchuji.com/

1651 establishments in Japan
Buddhist temples in Nagoya
Owari Tokugawa family
Pure Land temples